Zaplavnoye is a rural locality (a selo) and the administrative center of Zaplavnenskoye Rural Settlement, Leninsky District, Volgograd Oblast, Russia. The population was 3,734 as of 2010. There are 66 streets.

Geography 
Zaplavnoye is located on the left bank of the Akhtuba River, 21 km west of Leninsk (the district's administrative centre) by road. Vosmoye Marta is the nearest rural locality.

References 

Rural localities in Leninsky District, Volgograd Oblast